The following lists events that have happened in 1926 in the United Mexican States.

Incumbents

Federal government
President: Plutarco Elías Calles
 Interior Secretary (SEGOB): 
 Secretary of Foreign Affairs (SRE): 
 Communications Secretary (SCT): 
 Education Secretary (SEP):

Supreme Court

 President of the Supreme Court:

Governors
 Aguascalientes: Benjamín Azpeitia Puga/Francisco Reyes Barrientos/Alberto González Hermosillo Barragán
 Campeche: Ángel Castillo Lanz
 Chiapas: Luis P. Vidal
 Chihuahua: Jesús Antonio Almeida
 Coahuila: Manuel Pérez Treviño
 Colima: Gerardo Hurtado Sánchez
 Durango: 
 Guanajuato: Enrique Colunga
 Guerrero: Héctor F. López 
 Hidalgo: Matías Rodríguez
 Jalisco: José Guadalupe Zuno/Clemente Sepúlveda/Silvano Barba González
 State of Mexico: Carlos Riva Palacio
 Michoacán: Enrique Ramírez Aviña 
 Morelos: Provisional Government
 Nayarit: José de la Peña Ledón 
 Nuevo León: Jeronimo Siller
 Oaxaca: Genaro V. Vázquez 
 Puebla: Donato Bravo Izquierdo
 Querétaro: Abraham Araujo
 San Luis Potosí: Abel Cano Villa
 Sinaloa: Jose Maria Guerrero Sosa
 Sonora: Alejo Bay
 Tabasco: Tomás Garrido Canabal/Santiago Ruiz Sobredo/Augusto Hernández Oliva
 Tamaulipas: Emilio Portes Gil	
 Tlaxcala: 
 Veracruz: Heriberto Jara Corona/Abel S. Rodríguez
 Yucatán: Felipe Carrillo Puerto
 Zacatecas:

Events
 August 3 – Some 400 armed Catholics barricaded themselves in the Church of Our Lady of Guadalupe in Guadalajara, Jalisco and exchanged gunfire with federal troops until they ran out of ammunition and surrendered. According to U.S. consular sources, 18 were killed and 40 wounded.
 October 12–November 2 – The Central American and Caribbean Games take place in Mexico City.

Births
January 24 — Alejandro Cervantes Delgado, economist and politician (PRI); Governor of Guerrero 1981–1987 (d. 2000)
February 10 — Carmen Romano de Lopez, First Lady of Mexico (1976-1982) (d. 2000).
March 20 — Marcela Lombardo Otero, daughter of Vicente Lombardo Toledano, politician (Popular Socialist Party (PPS),  (d. 2018).
April 7 – Julio Scherer García, journalist (Excélsior and Proceso) (d. January 7, 2015).
April 15 — Manuel Capetillo, bullfighter, actor, singer, and songwriter (d. 2009).
May 29 – Teodoro González de León, architect ("Ciudad Universitaria" of the U.N.A.M.); (d. September 16, 2016).
August 8 – Arturo García Bustos, painter (d. 2017)
 September 4 — Ivan Illich, Austrian philosopher and Catholic priest who founded the Centro Intercultural de Documentación in Cuernavaca, Morelos (d. 2002).
October 1 − Miguel León-Portilla, anthropologist and historian (d. 2019).
 November 11 — Cardinal Juan Jesús Posadas Ocampo, archbishop of the Roman Catholic Archdiocese of Guadalajara 1987-1993 (assassinated May 24, 1993)
December 23 — Leticia Palma, (Zoyla Gloria Ruiz Moscoso) actress (En la palma de tu mano), (d. 2009)
 Date unknown: 
Valdemar Jiménez Solís, poet, académic, and cultural journalist (d. August 20, 2017).
Antonio Riva Palacio, governor of Morelos 1988-1994 (d. 2014)

Deaths
 July 22: General Vicente Aranda, Zapatista general and municipal president of Jojutla.

References

 
1920s in Mexico
Years of the 20th century in Mexico
Mexico
Mexico